Henry Ward may refer to:

Henry Ward, 5th Viscount Bangor (1828–1911), Irish representative peer
Henry Ward (architect) (1854–1927), English architect working in Hastings
Henry Ward (artist) (born 1971), British artist
Henry Ward (barrister) (died 1556), Member of Parliament for Norwich
Henry Ward (baseball), American baseball player
Henry Ward (basketball) (born 1952), American professional basketball player
Henry Ward (Kentucky politician) (1909–2002), Kentucky politician
Henry Ward (VC) (1823–1867), English recipient of the Victoria Cross in the Indian Mutiny
Henry Alfred Ward (1849–1934), Canadian politician
Henry Arthur Ward (1889–1908), Birmingham whistle maker
Henry Augustus Ward (1834–1906), American naturalist
Henry Baldwin Ward (1865–1945), American zoologist
Henry Dana Ward (1797–1884), American abolitionist, anti-Masonic campaigner, and Millerite Adventist
Henry Galbraith Ward (1851–1933), American judge  
Sir Henry George Ward (1797–1860), English diplomat and politician 
Henry Snowden Ward (1865–1911), English photographer and author
Henry Ward (revolutionary), delegate to the Stamp Act Congress

See also

H. M. A. Warde (Henry Murray Ashley Warde, 1850–1940), British soldier and Chief Constable of Kent
 Sir Henry Warde (British Army officer), British Army officer and colonial governor
Harry Ward (disambiguation)